The Erasmus was an express train that linked The Hague, the Dutch seat of Government, with Munich in Germany. The train was named after the Dutch Renaissance humanist Desiderius Erasmus.

Trans Europ Express
The Erasmus was launched on 3 June 1973 on request of the Nederlandse Spoorwegen in order to provide a direct TEE-service between The Hague and Germany. The Deutsche Bundesbahn wanted to have an extra TEE service linking Cologne and Munich using the same intinary as the former TEE Rheinpfeil. Although the Rheinpfeil was relabeled from TEE to IC already in 1971 a time-consuming exchange of coaches, including vista-domes, with the TEE Rheingold in Duisburg was upheld until May 1973. The new TEE Erasmus was scheduled to have timed connections with the TEE Prinz Eugen in both directions in Würzburg. From 1973 on there were no exchanges of coaches in Duisburg any more between Rheingold and Rheinpfeil (the Rheinpfeil even was rerouted to Basel instead of Munich in 1979). However the maintenance of the ADm vista-dome cars had to take place in the DB-works in Münich, which was not on the Rheingold's route at that time. In order to include the regular maintenance in the normal operation the Erasmus got vista-dome cars as well. The formations of TEE Rheingold and TEE Erasmus changed places, Hook of Holland and The Hague, during the night so every vista-dome car could be serviced in Münich every 5 days. Initially the service started in The Hague HS (Holland Station) on the Amsterdam-Rotterdam railway, using a connection track to the Hague - Utrecht - Germany railway to go eastbound. After the completing of The Hague Central Station, the Western terminus of the Hague-Utrecht-Germany railway, on 30 May 1976 the Western terminus changed to Central station instead of Holland Station, thus abandoning the connection track.

In Germany the train was running via Cologne, Mainz Hbf, Frankfurt Hbf and Wurzburg Hbf to Munich. Between 1976 and 1979 the route on its 

In 1976 the Vista-dome cars were withdrawn from service in all trains and replaced by class ARD (bar/business) coaches. Also the route of the Erasmus was changed on its southern part between Mainz and Munich to Mannheim Hbf - Stuttgart Hbf - Augsburg Hbf. But from 1979 until the train's final journey in 1980, the route was changed back to be running via Frankfurt and Wurzburg.

Second Class
In September 1980 the Dutch terminus was altered to Amsterdam and the southern terminus to Innsbruck in Austria. The Erasmus continued as InterCity service until 30 May 1987. On 31 May 1987 the Erasmus was part of the initial EuroCity services. On 2 June 1991 the route was shortened to Amsterdam - Cologne and eventually replaced by ICE services on 3 November 2000.

References

Works cited

International named passenger trains
Named passenger trains of Austria
Named passenger trains of Germany
Named passenger trains of the Netherlands
Trans Europ Express
EuroCity
Railway services introduced in 1973
Railway services discontinued in 2000